Caos calmo may refer to:

 , a 2005 novel by Sandro Veronesi
 Quiet Chaos (film), a 2008 Italian film based on the novel